

This is a list of the National Register of Historic Places listings in Westchester County, New York.

This is intended to be a complete list of the properties and districts on the National Register of Historic Places in Westchester County, New York, United States. Latitude and longitude coordinates are provided for many National Register properties and districts; these locations may be seen together in a map.

There are 240 properties and districts listed on the National Register in the county, including 19 National Historic Landmarks. The cities of New Rochelle, Peekskill, and Yonkers are the locations of 12, 14, and 28 of these properties and districts respectively, including two National Historic Landmarks (one in New Rochelle and one in Yonkers).

Current listings

New Rochelle

Peekskill

Yonkers

Northern Westchester

Southern Westchester

See also

National Register of Historic Places listings in New York

References

Further reading
  

Westchester County, New York
Westchester County